The 1993 World Table Tennis Championships women's singles was the 42nd edition of the women's singles championship.
Hyun Jung-hwa defeated Chen Jing in the final by three sets to nil, to win the title.

Results

See also
List of World Table Tennis Championships medalists

References

-
World